AATF  may refer to:
 Air Assault Task Force, a computer wargame
 Airport and Airway Trust Fund, a fund for the federal commitment to the USA's aviation system
 American Association of Teachers of French, a professional organisation for teachers of French in the United States
 Apoptosis antagonizing transcription factor, a human gene